Northwest (NW or N.W.) is the northwestern quadrant of Washington, D.C., the capital of the United States, and is located north of the National Mall and west of North Capitol Street. It is the largest of the four quadrants of the city (NW, NE, SW and SE), and it includes the central business district, the Federal Triangle, and the museums along the northern side of the National Mall, as well as many of the District's historic neighborhoods.

Politically, Northwest is made up of parts of Wards 1, 2, 3, 4, 5, and 6, with Wards 1 and 3 being the only wards located entirely within the quadrant. The Northwest is the wealthiest quadrant of the city, particularly west of 16th Street.

The population of Northwest is 340,531, based on the data collected in the latest U.S. Census Bureau release. The population is 48.33% male, and 51.67% female. There are 146,397 households, with 57,445 being family households, and 88,951 being non-family households.

Geography

Northwest includes the following 58 neighborhoods:

 Adams Morgan
 American University Park
 Barnaby Woods
 Berkley
 Bloomingdale
 Brightwood
 Burleith
 Cathedral Heights
 Chevy Chase
 Chinatown
 Cleveland Park
 Colonial Village
 Columbia Heights
 Crestwood
 Downtown
 Dupont Circle
 Embassy Row
 Foggy Bottom
 Forest Hills
 Foxhall
 Friendship Heights
 Georgetown
 Glover Park
 Hawthorne
 Judiciary Square
 Kalorama
 Kalorama Triangle
 Kent
 LeDroit Park
 Logan Circle
 Manor Park
 Massachusetts Heights
 McLean Gardens
 Mount Pleasant
 Mount Vernon Square
 Mount Vernon Triangle
 NoMa
 North Cleveland Park
 North Gate
 Observatory Circle
 The Palisades
 Park View
 Penn Quarter
 Petworth
 Pleasant Plains
 Shaw
 Shepherd Park
 Sixteenth Street Heights
 Spring Valley
 Takoma
 Tenleytown
 Truxton Circle
  U Street Corridor
 Wakefield
 West End
 Woodland Normanstone
 Woodley Park
 Woodmont

Landmarks

Northwest contains many college campuses, including American University, George Washington University, Georgetown University, Howard University, and the University of the District of Columbia. Northwest also contains many primary and secondary schools, many of which are public schools administered by DCPS (District of Columbia Public Schools). There are 44 DCPS institutions in Northwest, as well as many private schools, including St John's College High School, Sidwell Friends School, Gonzaga College High School, Duke Ellington School of the Arts, and Georgetown Day School, among others. The Capital One Arena, home of the Washington Wizards, the Washington Capitals, and the Georgetown Hoyas as well as the venue for many concerts and other events, is located in the District's Chinatown in Northwest. The National Cathedral, the White House, Rock Creek Park, and Embassy Row are also located in this quadrant.

Transportation

Northwest is bounded by the Potomac River on the west, Western Avenue and Eastern Avenue to the north, North Capitol Street to the east, and the National Mall to the south. Other principal roads include Connecticut Avenue between Chevy Chase and the White House, Wisconsin Avenue between Friendship Heights and Georgetown, Pennsylvania Avenue between Georgetown and the Capitol, K Street, Massachusetts Avenue (home to Embassy Row), and 16th Street.

Northwest is served by all six lines of the Washington Metro: the Orange, Silver, Red, Blue,  Yellow, and Green Lines. Many Metrobus lines run through the quadrant, as well as the DC Circulator.

See also

SW—Southwest, Washington, D.C.
SE—Southeast, Washington, D.C.
NE—Northeast, Washington, D.C.

References

 
.